Fake memoirs form a category of literary forgery in which a wholly or partially fabricated autobiography, memoir or journal of an individual is presented as fact. In some cases, the purported author of the work is also a fabrication.

In recent years, there have been a number of such memoirs published by major publishers, some that were well received critically and became best-sellers, that have subsequently proven to have been partially or completely fabricated. A number of recent fake memoirs fall into the category of "misery lit", where the authors claim to have overcome overwhelming losses (i.e. bereavement, abuse, addiction, and poverty). Several more have detailed fabricated stories of Holocaust survival, with at least one having been penned by an actual Holocaust victim.

As a result of recent best-selling memoirs having been outed for falsification, there have been calls for stronger vetting and fact checking of an author's material.

Public reception
A number of fake memoirs in recent years have been published by renowned publishing houses and received critical acclaim only to be exposed as partial or complete fabrications. Fragments: Memories of a Wartime Childhood (Binjamin Wilkomirski), The Blood Runs Like a River Through My Dreams (Nasdijj), Love and Consequences (Margaret Seltzer), and Go Ask Alice (Anonymous) garnered praise from The New York Times before exposed as false.  Love and Consequences (Margaret Seltzer) and Odd Man Out (Matt McCarthy) were published by Penguin Group USA. A Million Little Pieces was published by Random House.

Two authors of recent fake memoirs, James Frey (A Million Little Pieces), and Herman Rosenblat (who was featured before he wrote Angel at the Fence), as well as an imposter assuming the name Anthony Godby Johnson (A Rock and a Hard Place), appeared on The Oprah Winfrey Show. All eventually had their mendacity made public, and the scheduled publication of Rosenblat's book was cancelled. Frey, accompanied by his editor Nan Talese, was confronted by Oprah during a follow-up episode.  The controversy over falsified memoirs inspired Andrea Troy to pen her satiric novel, Daddy – An Absolutely Authentic Fake Memoir (2008).

There is also the case of people who build up a public profile as a survivor of a disastrous event, with the intention of drawing attention and profiting from it. Some of these have achieved publishing deals with major publishers; for example, Belle Gibson had lucrative deals with Penguin and Simon & Schuster, before her story of self-cure from cancer was shown to be false.

List of fake memoirs and journals

See also 
Autofiction
Literary forgery
Misery lit
List of fictional diaries

References

Literary forgeries